The Poet and the Poem is an hour-long radio interview program hosted by Grace Cavalieri featuring with leading poets and sponsored by the Library of Congress and the Witter Bynner Foundation.

History
The program was started in 1977 by the poet and playwright Grace Cavalieri.  The program was first broadcast from WPFW in Washington, DC.  Cavalieri brought the program to the Library of Congress in 1997.
The programs archives are stored at the Gelman Library at George Washington University

Featured interviews 
The show regularly features interviews with writers from across the country.  Poets featured have included Abhay K, Francisco Aragón, Margaret Atwood, Sandra Beasley, Lucille Clifton, Cornelius Eady, Forrest Gander, Allen Ginsberg, Terrance Hayes, Major Jackson, June Jordan, Audre Lorde, Richard McCann, E. Ethelbert Miller, Naomi Shihab Nye, Linda Pastan, Kim Roberts, Henry Taylor, Emma Trelles, David Tucker, Dan Vera, and Alice Walker.

Given the program's longevity and its connection to the Library of Congress, Cavalieri has the distinction of having interviewed the most sitting poets laureate including Gwendolyn Brooks, Billy Collins, Rita Dove, Donald Hall, Ted Kooser, Stanley Kunitz, Howard Nemerov, Philip Levine, Robert Hass, Robert Pinsky, Kay Ryan and Charles Simic Mark Strand, and Richard Wilbur. The program has also featured interviews with the Witter Bynner Fellowship winners.

Broadcast 
Recorded and engineered at the Library of Congress, the program is broadcast on public radio stations across the United States through the Public Radio Exchange and is also available as a free podcast from the Library of Congress website.

References

External links
Program page on the Library of Congress website

American poetry
American public radio programs
Audio podcasts
English-language radio programs
Library of Congress
Arts organizations established in 1977
Poetry organizations
1977 radio programme debuts